Omamori Himari is an anime series adapted from the manga of the same title by Milan Matra. The story centers on Yuto Amakawa, a boy who, on day of his sixteenth birthday, meets Himari, a cat spirit in the form of a beautiful young girl. He learns from her that he is the descendant of one of the twelve Demon Slayer families that had slain ayakashi since feudal times, and that Himari has sworn an oath to protect him from the ayakashi that are out to kill him until his powers awaken. He later meets other girls who start out as enemies, but later become rivals for Yuto's affection as the series progresses. The anime follows the first twenty-nine chapters of the manga, with moderate changes to the original's storyline.

Produced by Zexcs and directed by Shinji Ushiro, the series was broadcast on TV Saitama and Chiba TV from January 6 to March 24, 2010, with subsequent broadcasts on Tokyo MX, TV Aichi, tvk, TVQ, and Sun Television. English-subtitled simulcasts were provided by Crunchyroll following its premiere date. Six DVD compilation volumes were released by Kadokawa Pictures between March 26 and August 28, 2010, with limited edition volumes also released. A Blu-ray box set was released on January 27, 2012.

The ending theme used in episode 12 is  performed by Yuto Amakawa (Daisuke Hirakawa).

Episode list

See also
List of Omamori Himari chapters
List of Omamori Himari characters

References

External links
Official website 

Omamori Himari
Episodes